The Philippine census is a regularly occurring and official inventory of the human population and housing units in the Philippines. Since 1970, the population has been enumerated every five years. Results from the censuses are used to allocate congressional seats and fund government programs.

The mid-year census is known as the Census of Population (POPCEN), while the decennial census is referred to as the Census of Population and Housing (CPH).

By virtue of Republic Act No. 10625, known as the Philippine Statistical Act of 2013, censuses in the Philippines are administered by the Philippine Statistics Authority (PSA) since the 2015 census.

History 
The first census in the Philippines in 1591, was based on tributes collected and yielded about 666,712 people in the islands. In 1799, Friar Manuel Buzeta estimated the population count as 1,502,574. However, the first official census in the Philippines was carried out by the Spanish government pursuant to a royal decree calling for the counting of persons living as of the midnight of December 31, 1877. Based on this census, the Philippines had a population of 5,567,685 as of the reference date. This was followed by another censuses, the 1887 census that yielded a count of 5,984,727.

The first census conducted by the U.S. military forces took place in 1903 to fulfill Public Act 467 which was approved by the United States Philippine Commission on October 6, 1902.

A four-volume description of this census was on hand some years ago at the National Archives in San Bruno, California, but the volumes appear to have since been misplaced.

Statistics 
For years between the censuses, the PSA and its precursor agencies have been issuing estimates made using surveys and statistical systems.

Based on the 2020 Philippine census, the national population is 109,035,343 as of 1 May 2020. From 2015 to 2020, the population grew by 1.63% per year on the average.

Notes

References

External links
Philippine Statistics Authority
Philippine Standard Geographic Code
Demographic Statistics
1995 Philippine Census Information
2000 Philippine Census Information
2007 Philippine Census Information

 
Government of the Philippines
Demographics of the Philippines
Recurring events established in 1877